The .218 Bee is a .22 caliber centerfire rifle cartridge designed for varmint hunting by Winchester in 1937. The cartridge was originally chambered in the Winchester Model 65 lever-action rifles, which may have ultimately led to its lack of popularity. The cartridge is named for the bore diameter of the barrel in which the cartridge is chambered rather than the usual practice in the United States of having the cartridge's nomenclature reflect in some way the bullet diameter.

History
The .218 Bee cartridge was designed by Winchester for use in their Model 65 lever-action rifles. Winchester designed the cartridge by necking down the .25-20 Winchester cartridge to accept a .224 diameter bullet. Just as the .32-20 can be considered to be the parent cartridge of the .25-20, it can also be considered the parent cartridge to the .218 Bee. The cartridge was introduced as a commercial cartridge by Winchester in 1937 in their Model 65 lever action rifle, which was also chambered for the .25-20 and .32-20 Winchester cartridges. However, while the .25-20 and the .32-20 Model 65 rifles have 22-inch (560 mm) barrels, the rifles chambered for the Bee have 24-inch (610 mm) barrels.

Despite showing some early promise, the cartridge never really caught on, even though it was later chambered by Winchester in their new bolt-action Model 43 rifle and by Sako in their L-46 rifle. There was some question about the accuracy of the .218 Bee as compared to the .222, but that was likely due to the difference of inherent accuracy between the bolt-actions rifles commonly chambered for the .222 and the lever-actions commonly chambered for the .218 Bee. Production ammunition and rifles are still available from a few manufacturers.

Performance
In terms of relative performance, the .218 Bee falls between the smaller .22 Hornet, and the larger .222 Remington and the more popular .223 Remington. In terms of short-range velocity, the .218 works quite well.

See also
 5 mm caliber
 List of rifle cartridges
 Table of handgun and rifle cartridges

Notes

References
 The .218 Bee by Chuck Hawks
 Contender Varminting - .218 Bee at Rocky's Reloading Room

218 Bee
Winchester Repeating Arms Company cartridges